The Daniel C. Van Brunt House is located in Horicon, Wisconsin.

History
The house was originally built for dentist William Decker, then occupied from 1868 by Van Brunt, a wagon builder who with his brother designed and built the first mechanical broadcast seeder marketed in the U.S. Later the Horicon Community Center. It was listed on the National Register of Historic Places in 1981 and the State Register of Historic Places in 1989.

References

Houses on the National Register of Historic Places in Wisconsin
National Register of Historic Places in Dodge County, Wisconsin
Houses in Dodge County, Wisconsin
Italianate architecture in Wisconsin
Brick buildings and structures
Houses completed in 1858